Blackford is a village in Cumbria, England, close to Gretna, Scotland.

Etymology
Blackford means what it says, a black ford or river-crossing. However, unlike other places of the name, it is a mix of Old English and Old Norse: the first element is Old English 
blǣc "black", while the second element is Old Norse vathr / vaőr, ford, river crossing,
which usually occurs as -wath in place-names with this element (e.g. Wath upon Dearne). The name was recorded as Blakiwaith in 1165.

See also

Listed buildings in Westlinton

References

Villages in Cumbria
City of Carlisle